Martin Fuller Angell (December 29, 1878 – September 3, 1930) was an American football and baseball coach and physics and mathematics professor.

Angell was born in Delavan, Wisconsin, in 1878. He attended the University of Wisconsin where he received a bachelor's degree in 1902. 

Angell became a professor of physics and mathematics at the University of New Mexico in 1903 and received his master's degree there. In 1905, he also became a professor in electrical engineering and secured the university's first engineering equipment. He became the dean of the engineering college at the University of New Mexico and was referred to as the "father of the engineering college". He received his Ph.D. from the University of Wisconsin in 1911.

While at the University of New Mexico, he also served as the head football and baseball coach. 

Angell joined the physics department at the University of Idaho in 1913. In 1921, he became dean of the university's college of letters and sciences. In 1927, he also became dean of the graduate school. He also served for two years as executive dean of the university's southern branch at Pocatello for two years.

Angell died in 1930 in Spokane, Washington, after being diagnosed with undulant or Malta fever.

References

1878 births
1930 deaths
New Mexico Lobos baseball coaches
New Mexico Lobos football coaches
University of Idaho faculty
University of New Mexico faculty